The Turgeon River is a tributary of the Harricana River that flows to the southern shore of James Bay. The Turgeon River is a river flowing mainly in the municipality of Eeyou Istchee Baie-James (municipality), in the administrative region of Nord-du-Québec, in Quebec, in Canada.

Geography 
The Turgeon River originates at Lake Turgeon (Eeyou Istchee Baie-James) (length:), which is located in the administrative region of Abitibi-Temiscamingue (southern part of the lake) and Nord-du-Québec (northern part of the lake).

The Turgeon River makes a  foray into Ontario where it catches the waters of the Burntbush River and the Patten River.

From there, the river collects the waters of the Detour River before turning east and descending , forming a large loop to the south, to the confluence of the Wawagosic River. The mouth is located in the municipality of Eeyou Istchee Baie-James (municipality).

Main tributaries 
 Leslie Creek (Quebec)
Boivin River (Quebec)
Burntbush River (Ontario)
Patten River (Quebec / Ontario)
Detour River (Ontario / Quebec)
Wawagosic River (Quebec)

Crossed cities 
Villebois, Quebec
Valcanton, Quebec

History 
Before the arrival of the explorers of European ancestry, these lands were inhabited by Algonquins. The region was covered with forests until the 1930s when a large number of unemployed fleeing the major Canadian cities struck by the global economic crisis arrived there in the hope of establishing themselves and rebuilding their lives.

At the time there was no road, so the people crossed the valley in barge, following the course of river.

Three parishes were founded there in the 1930s, namely Saint-Joachim-de-Beaucanton, Saint-Camille-de-Villebois and Saint-Ephrem-de-Val-Paradis. Today, Beaucanton and Val-Paradis have merged to become Valcanton, Quebec, and these villages are part of the huge municipality of Eeyou Istchee Baie-James (municipality), the largest in the world.

In the 1940s and 1950s, several covered bridges were built in the Turgeon Valley. Five can still be visited today: three on the Turgeon River and two on its tributaries.

Toponymy 
The lake and the Turgeon River owe their name to the Minister of Lands and Forests of the time. The proclamation was made by the Honorable Adélard Turgeon in 1908. The first nations named him Nikikwatinipi (Lac Frimas). The name "rivière Turgeon" was officially registered on December 5, 1968, at the Commission de toponymie du Québec.

See also

References

External links 

Turgeon
Rivers of Nord-du-Québec